Francisco Javier Pereira Megía (born 13 May 1966) is a Spanish football manager and former player who played as a right winger.

Playing career
Born in Badajoz, Extremadura, Pereira only played amateur football during his career. After notably playing one match for Segunda División B side CD Badajoz in the 1984–85 season, he went on to represent UD Montijo, CD Díter Zafra, AD Puebla Patria, CP Sanvicenteño and CD Guadiana.

Pereira eventually retired at the age of just 28, after having degrees in Law and Psychology and a job at the Social security of his hometown.

Managerial career
After retiring, Pereira started his managerial career in 2001, with former side Badajoz's reserve team. On 18 July 2003, he was named manager of Tercera División side CD Don Benito, achieving promotion to the third division in his first season but being sacked in March 2005; his club suffered relegation nonetheless. He eventually returned to Don Benito in 2006, but as a sporting director.

In 2007, Pereira left Don Benito to join Juan Ignacio Martínez's staff at UD Salamanca, as his assistant manager. The duo also worked together at Albacete Balompié before the appointment of Pereira as Deportivo Alavés manager on 22 June 2009.

Sacked by Alavés on 1 February 2010, Pereira returned to his previous role as JIMs assistant at Cartagena, Levante and Valladolid. In 2014 he moved abroad, joining Óscar García's staff at Watford, and continued at the club despite García's departure, working as an assistant of subsequent managers Billy McKinlay and Slaviša Jokanović.

Pereira continued to work with Jokanović in the following three seasons, being his assistant at Maccabi Tel Aviv and Fulham. In 2018, after Jokanović was fired, Pereira joined Jordi Cruyff's staff at Chongqing Lifan.

On 30 January 2020, Pereira returned to Fulham as an Assistant Director of Football Operations. He moved back to China on 11 September, after being named manager of Henan Jianye. He steered the club to safety in the relegation play-off, courtesy of four wins and two draws.

In October 2021, Pereira rescinded his contract in Asia and came home to manage struggling La Liga side Levante UD for the rest of the season, with two more campaigns as option. On 29 November, he was sacked by the club, who were bottom of the league and without a win. At the turn of the year, he returned to the Chinese Super League, joining the renamed Henan Songshan Longmen. In the following year, he joined Shanghai Port as the new manager.

Personal life
Pereira's father José Luis was also a footballer. A midfielder, his professional inputs consisted of 31 appearances in three seasons with CF Extremadura and Badajoz.

References

External links

1966 births
Living people
Sportspeople from Badajoz
Spanish footballers
Footballers from Extremadura
Association football wingers
Segunda División B players
Tercera División players
CD Badajoz players
Spanish football managers
La Liga managers
Segunda División B managers
Deportivo Alavés managers
Levante UD managers
Chinese Super League managers
Henan Songshan Longmen F.C. managers
Watford F.C. non-playing staff
Fulham F.C. non-playing staff
Spanish expatriate football managers
Spanish expatriate sportspeople in England
Spanish expatriate sportspeople in Israel
Spanish expatriate sportspeople in China
Expatriate football managers in China